Analytik Jena AG, based in Jena (Thuringia, Germany), is a provider of analytical, bioanalytical and optical systems for industrial and scientific applications. Analytik Jena was founded in 1990 as a sales and service company for analytical technology. The company has been listed on the Frankfurt Stock Exchange from July 3, 2000 until March 27, 2015. Analytik Jena and its subsidiaries employ about 1,000 people in more than 90 countries. The international Group earns two-thirds of sales abroad and maintains business relationships in more than 120 countries around the globe.

History 

Analytik Jena was founded jointly by the present-day Executive Board member Klaus Berka along with Jens Adomat in 1990, shortly after East Germany's peaceful revolution. At the beginning, the two former Zeiss employees managed the distribution of analytical measuring instruments, primarily in Thuringia, Saxony and Saxony-Anhalt.

In 1994, first shares in IDC Geräteentwicklungsgesellschaft mbH Langewiesen were acquired, a company whose products Analytik Jena had been selling since 1992. Due to the purchase of the laboratory analysis technology of Carl Zeiss Jena GmbH at the end of 1995, the Company's market share in the instrument business increased further. Analytik Jena had become a manufacturing company in the analytical technology segment, laying the foundation for the “Analytical Instrumentation” business unit. This acquisition marked the beginning of the research and development of analytical systems in the area of atomic absorption spectrometry and molecular spectroscopy.

On July 3, 2000, the shares of Analytik Jena AG were traded for the first time on the Frankfurt Stock Exchange's “Neuer Markt” segment. In this way, important liquidity for the further expansion of sales activity and the advancement of research and development was secured. In the subsequent years, Analytik Jena enforced its growth path due to strategic acquisitions, the expansion of international sales activities and the founding of subsidiaries in Germany and abroad. After expanding to Eastern and Western Europe and to the US, Analytik Jena has grown significantly in Asia. Especially China is an important foreign market of the Company.

In order to take advantage of the opportunities offered by the biotechnology market, Analytik Jena has found its third business unit “Life Science”. With the acquisition of Biometra GmbH, CyBio AG, and the US company UVP, LLC the Company expanded its product portfolio.

One of the most important business acquisitions in the history of Analytik Jena AG has been closed in 2014. With this acquisition, the Company entered the rapidly growing global ICP-MS (Inductively Coupled Plasma Mass Spectrometry) market. Analytik Jena thereby further broadened its atomic spectroscopy portfolio and is among the few suppliers that offer all three core technologies for elemental trace analysis (AAS, ICP-OES, and ICP-MS).

Today, Swiss group Endress+Hauser has the majority holding of Analytik Jena AG. In September 2015, Endress+Hauser submitted the squeeze-out request to the Analytik Jena AG. At this time, Endress+Hauser held a stake of 96.18% in the share capital of Analytik Jena AG. Since March 27, 2015 the shares of the Jena AG are no longer listed on the regulated market of the Frankfurt Stock Exchange.

Business Model 

Analytik Jena's business model is structured on the basis of corporate activities in the three operational segments Analytical Instrumentation and Life Science. With these symbiotically interwoven business units for specialized instruments, Analytik Jena offers products for a technology sector that is both modern and in demand.

Analytical Instrumentation 

Analytik Jena provides high-end analysis systems for the qualitative and quantitative analysis of liquids, solids, and gases in environmental, foodstuffs, pharmaceutical, medical, and agricultural Analysis.
 Mass Spectrometry: ICP-MS
 Inductively coupled plasma: ICP-OES
 Atomic Spectrometry: AAS | AFS | Microwave
 Molecular Spectroscopy: UV/Vis | NIR
 Sum Parameters: TOC | TN | TNb | AOX | TOX | TX
 Elemental Analysis: C | N | S | Cl
 Antioxidants/Free radicals
 Water Determination
 LIMS

Life Science 

Analytik Jena's business unit Life Science is a system provider for bioanalysis. It demonstrates the biotechnological competence of Analytik Jena AG and provides a wide product spectrum for automated total, as well as individual solutions for molecular diagnostics. Its products are focused to offer quality and the reproducibility of laboratory results. Besides the unit offers customized solutions, it is also able to adapt its products to the customer's needs. The wide product spectrum is made possible through the synergism between Analytik Jena and its product lines Biometra and CyBio.

 Bioanalytical Instruments, e.g. biomolecular interaction analysis, homogenizer, thermal mixer, automated purification, mobile diagnostics, thermal cycler, fluorescence reader, spectrophotometer and liquid handling
 Kits for manual or automated nucleic acid isolation as well as enzymes, reagents, and additives for PCR, as well as protein analysis and molecular diagnostic kits
 Reagents, e.g. PCR polymerases and master mixes 
 Consumables, e.g. microplates, strips, tubes, sealing foils, and pipetting tips

Corporate Structure 

The Analytik Jena Group headquarter is located in Jena, Germany with additional branches. Outside Germany Analytik Jena is represented in Thailand (Far East Office), Russia (Moscow Office), China (Beijing Office), and UAE (Dubai Branch Office).

The following companies are domestic subsidiaries of Analytik Jena:
 AJ Blomesystem GmbH, (100.0%), since 03/30/2006
 AJ Innuscreen GmbH, (100.0%), since 12/17/2010
 AJ Roboscreen GmbH, (100.0%), since 03/15/2012
 AJ Vorratsgesellschaft mbH, (100.0%), since 03/30/2006
 AJZ Engineering GmbH, (100.0%), since 10/02/2013
 Biometra GmbH, (100.0%), since 05/11/2009
 ETG Geräteentwicklungs-Gesellschaft mbH, (80.0%), since 03/27/2013
 Moldiax GmbH, (100.0%), since 05/01/2015
Analytik Jena has also subsidiaries in foreign countries:
 AJ Instruments India Pvt. Ltd., (99.0%), since 11/01/2014
 AJZ Engineering Algerie SARL, (85,0 %), since 10/02/2013 
 AJZ Engineering Libya, Ltd., (100,0 %), since 10/02/2013
 TOO AJZ Engineering GmbH, (100,0 %), since 10/02/2013
 Analytik Jena Far East (Thailand) Ltd., (49,0 %)*, since 04/30/2013
 Analytik Jena France SARL, (100.0%), since 01/10/2013
 Analytik Jena Korea Ltd., (100.0%), since 03/10/2015
 Analytik Jena US, Inc., (100.0%), since 02/25/2009 
 Analytik Jena Japan. Co., Ltd., (100.0%), since 04/01/2006
 Analytik Jena Romania srl., (70.0%), since 10/16/2008
 Analytik Jena Shanghai Instruments Ltd. Co., (100.0%), since 09/17/2004
 UVP, LLC, (100.0%), since 04/05/2013

References 

Companies listed on the Frankfurt Stock Exchange
Companies based in Thuringia
Chemical companies of Germany
Multinational companies headquartered in Germany
German brands
Jena
Laboratory equipment manufacturers
Research support companies